The 1942 Nobel Prize in Literature was not awarded due to the ongoing World War II. Instead, the prize money was allocated with 1/3 to the Main Fund and with 2/3 to the Special Fund of this prize section. This was the sixth occasion in Nobel history that the prize was not conferred.

Nominations
Despite no author(s) being awarded for the 1941 prize due to the ongoing second world war, a number of literary critics, societies and academics continued sending nominations to the Nobel Committee of the Swedish Academy, hoping that their nominated candidate may be considered for the prize. In total, the academy received 30 nominations for 16 individuals.

Six of the nominees were newly nominated namely Nikolai Berdyaev, Sigfrid Siwertz, Teixeira de Pascoaes, Charles Langbridge Morgan, Enrique Larreta, Hans Carossa. The highest number of nominations was for the Danish author Johannes Vilhelm Jensen, who was awarded in 1944, with seven nomination. It was followed by Argentinian academic Enrique Larreta who received 5 nominations from literary academies and various universities. Two of the nominees were women namely the Chilean poet Gabriela Mistral (awarded in 1945) and Portuguese writer Maria Madalena de Martel Patrício.

The authors Yosano Akiko, Nini Roll Anker, Eleanor Stackhouse Atkinson, Franz Boas, Libero Bovio, Léon Daudet, Fabio Fiallo, Rachel Field, Sakutarō Hagiwara, Cosmo Hamilton, Miguel Hernández, Daniil Kharms, Olha Kobylianska, Oskar Kraus, Clementine Krämer, Yanka Kupala, Bronisław Malinowski, Lucy Maud Montgomery Robert Musil, Irène Némirovsky, Bruno Schulz, Edith Stein, Jakob van Hoddis, Carolyn Wells, Xiao Hong, and Stefan Zweig died in 1942 without having been nominated for the prize.

References

1942
Cultural history of World War II